Leiocephalus inaguae, commonly known as the Inagua curlytail lizard, is a species of lizard in the family Leiocephalidae.

Description
Males of L. inaguae can reach 90 mm (3.5 inches) snout-to-vent length (SVL), females are smaller at about 74 mm (3 inches) SVL. There is a strong colouration difference between the males and females (dichromatism).

Habitat
L. inaguae prefers dry, exposed areas and is common on the coast, where it can be found amongst building materials, rocks, and drift wood.

Diet
The species L. inaguae is a typical omnivore, feeding on insects (Lepidoptera larvae, Coleoptera, Formicidae), spiders, fruits, flowers, and buds.

Geographic range
The Inagua curly-tailed lizard is endemic to the Bahamas and has an extremely restricted range as it is only found on Great Inagua.

Conservation status
L. inaguae is not listed by the IUCN or CITES as needing any special conservation, however, research is needed to determine its vulnerability due to its restricted range.

References

Further reading
Cochran DM (1931). "New Bahamian reptiles". J. Washington Acad. Sci. 21: 39–41. (Leiocephalus inaguae, new species, p. 40).
Schwartz A, Thomas R (1975). A Check-list of West Indian Amphibians and Reptiles. Carnegie Museum of Natural History Special Publication No. 1. Pittsburgh, Pennsylvania: Carnegie Museum of Natural History. 216 pp. (Leiocephalus inaguae, p. 130).

External links
Bahamas National Trust
Ardastra Gardens, Zoo and Conservation Center

Leiocephalus
Fauna of the Bahamas
Endemic fauna of the Bahamas
Reptiles described in 1923
Taxa named by Doris Mable Cochran